Santa Maria Novella is a Romanesque-style, Roman Catholic parish church located on Via Pisani #45 in the village (frazione) of Marti, in the town limits of Montopoli in Val d'Arno, in the province of Pisa, region of Tuscany, Italy.

History and Decoration
A church at the site was begun in 1332. Built with brick, the exterior has an austere and rustic with some pilasters and blind arches. The single nave was refurbished in the 18th century, when it was frescoed by Anton Domenico Bamberini. It also has frescoes depicting the Baptism of Christ. There are altarpieces by Matteo Rosselli (St Peter healing the Lame, 1558) and by Taddeo Naldini (Resurrection). The crucifix on the left nave altar is attributed to Ferdinando Tacca.

References

Churches in the province of Pisa
11th-century Roman Catholic church buildings in Italy